Pogson is a lunar impact crater on the Moon's far side, behind the southeastern limb. It is located midway between the flooded crater Lebedev to the southwest and Bjerknes to the northeast. Farther west of Pogson is the uneven Mare Australe.

This is a circular crater with a somewhat worn rim. A small craterlet lies across the southern rim, and pair is located long the northeastern rim. The interior floor has a slightly lower albedo than the surroundings, and is level and nearly featureless.

Satellite craters
By convention these features are identified on lunar maps by placing the letter on the side of the crater midpoint that is closest to Pogson.

See also 
 Asteroid 1830 Pogson

References

 
 
 
 
 
 
 
 
 
 
 
 

Impact craters on the Moon